Martin Petkov may refer to:

 Martin Petkov (footballer, born 2001), Bulgarian football winger for Lokomotiv Gorna Oryahovitsa on loan from Levski Sofia
 Martin Petkov (footballer, born 2002), Bulgarian football winger for Levski Sofia